Joseph-Clair Reyne (4 January 1824 – 14 November 1872) was a French clergyman and bishop for the Roman Catholic Diocese of Basse-Terre. Reyne was born in Manosque. He became ordained in 1848. He was appointed bishop in 1870. He died on 14 November 1872, at the age of 48.

References

French Roman Catholic bishops in North America
1824 births
1872 deaths
People from Manosque
19th-century French Roman Catholic bishops
Roman Catholic bishops of Basse-Terre